Williamsfield may refer to places:

In the United States
Williamsfield, Illinois
Williamsfield, Ohio
Williamsfield Township, Ashtabula County, Ohio

Elsewhere
Williamsfield, Jamaica